Fate: The Winx Saga is a teen drama television series based on the animated series Winx Club, created by Iginio Straffi. It is produced by Archery Pictures in association with Rainbow, a studio co-owned by Iginio Straffi and Viacom at the time. Developed by Brian Young, who also acts as the showrunner and executive producer, it stars Abigail Cowen, Hannah van der Westhuysen, Precious Mustapha, Eliot Salt and Elisha Applebaum.

Iginio Straffi first proposed a live-action version of Winx Club in 2011, after Viacom, owner of Nickelodeon, became a co-owner of his studio and started financing his projects. Before approving production on the series, Straffi gained experience with live-action television working as a producer for Nickelodeon's Club 57. Principal photography for Fate eventually began in September 2019 in Ireland.

Early in production, Nickelodeon's American crew members from the cartoon, including Bloom's voice actress, Molly Quinn, met with the Fate production team and reviewed the pilot script. Rainbow's Joanne Lee also oversaw the show as an executive producer. Apart from them, the crew behind Fate is entirely new to the Winx franchise, and the writers were recruited from teen dramas like The Vampire Diaries.

The series features an ensemble cast based on the characters of the animated show. The six-episode first season debuted on Netflix on 22 January 2021 and was watched by 57 million subscribers in the first 28 days of its release. In February 2021, the series was renewed for a second season, which was released on 16 September 2022. In November 2022, the series was canceled after two seasons.

Premise
Bloom, a fairy with fire powers, enrolls at a magical boarding school in the Otherworld called Alfea. She shares a suite with Stella, a light fairy; Aisha, a water fairy; Terra, an earth fairy; and Musa, a mind fairy. With the help of her friends, Bloom starts to learn more about her past. Meanwhile, ancient creatures called the Burned Ones return to the Otherworld and threaten everyone at Alfea.

Cast and characters

Main

 Abigail Cowen as Bloom, a fire fairy who was raised on Earth by human parents, and who discovers that she is fairy when her powers manifest dangerously. Bloom comes to Alfea to learn to control her powers and to discover her origins.
 Hannah van der Westhuysen as Stella, a fashionista light fairy and Sky's former girlfriend, who initially dislikes Bloom. She is the princess of Solaria and Queen Luna's daughter.
 Precious Mustapha as Aisha, an athletic water fairy from Andros with a practical mindset and a moral compass
 Eliot Salt as Terra Harvey, an awkward earth fairy who is Ben's daughter and Sam's sister. She was raised at Alfea but has trouble connecting socially. She is Flora's cousin.
 Elisha Applebaum as Musa, a mind fairy who feels other people's emotions. Because of her struggles with her powers, she initially tries to put emotional distance between herself and others.
 Danny Griffin as Sky, one of the most skilled specialists, who is Andreas of Eraklyon's son. The star of his class, he was raised by his adoptive father, Silva. He is immediately attracted to Bloom.
 Sadie Soverall as Beatrix, an air fairy who can manipulate electricity. She is interested in Alfea's dark history and knows more than others about Bloom's mysterious origins, but not her own. She is revealed to be Andreas' adoptive daughter.
 Freddie Thorp as Riven, a nonchalant and flirty second-year specialist and Sky's best friend. He later becomes sexually involved with Beatrix and Dane.
 Eva Birthistle as Vanessa Peters (season 1), Mike's wife and Bloom's adoptive mother. She is covered in burn scars because of an incident where Bloom lost control of her powers.
 Robert James-Collier as Saul Silva, the fencing instructor at Alfea, and Sky's guardian. He was mentored by Sky's father and raised Sky after his death.
 Eve Best as Farah Dowling, the headmistress of Alfea and one of the most powerful fairies of the Otherworld, who works behind the scenes to protect her students from threats beyond Alfea's boundary.
 Lesley Sharp (season 1) / Miranda Richardson (season 2) as Rosalind Hale, the former headmistress of Alfea who is revealed to be plotting with Queen Luna and Andreas to take over the school again
 Theo Graham as Dane (main season 2; recurring  season 1), a first-year Specialist who has a crush on Riven
 Jacob Dudman as Sam Harvey (main season 2; recurring  season 1), an earth fairy with the ability to phase through walls and objects. He is Ben's son and Terra's brother.
 Ken Duken as Andreas of Eraklyon (main season 2; recurring season 1), Sky's biological father and Beatrix's adoptive father
 Brandon Grace as Grey Owens (season 2), a specialist who has an immediate mutual attraction with Aisha but who is revealed to have a dark secret
 Éanna Hardwicke as Sebastian Valtor (season 2), a former specialist, Alfea graduate and Saul's friend, who also shares a connection to witches
 Paulina Chávez as Flora (season 2), an optimistic earth fairy, who is Terra and Sam's cousin, and who quickly is taken in by the Winx fairy group

Recurring

 Josh Cowdery as Mike Peters (season 1), Vanessa's husband and Bloom's adoptive father
 Alex Macqueen (season 1) / Daniel Betts (season 2) as Professor Ben Harvey, a botany teacher and greenhouse worker at Alfea, who is Terra's and Sam's father
 Kate Fleetwood as Queen Luna, the authoritarian queen of Solaria and Stella's mother
 Leah Minto as Kat, a specialist
 Sean Sagar as Marco, an air fairy and Alfea graduate who is now a teacher
 Sarah Jane Seymour as Noura, a specialist at Alfea
 Pom Boyd as Doris (season 1), the dinner lady at Alfea 
 Harry Michell as Callum Hunter (season 1), Dowling's assistant 
 Jayden Revri as Devin (season 2), a mind fairy who is attacked by scrapers
 JJ Battell as Luke (season 2), a specialist
 Shameem Ahmad as Bavani Selvarajah (season 2), commander of Solaria's royal army

Episodes

Series overview

Season 1 (2021)

Season 2 (2022)

Production

Season 1

Development
The idea for a live-action adaptation of Winx Club dates back to 2011. Winx Club creator Iginio Straffi first proposed a live version in May 2011, several months after Viacom, owner of Nickelodeon, became a co-owner of his studio Rainbow and started financing his projects. At the Ischia Global Fest in 2013, Straffi stated that he was still planning a production "with the Winx in flesh and blood, played by real actors. Sooner or later it will be done." Straffi had only worked on animated productions at the time, so he transitioned his focus to live action, working as a producer for Nickelodeon's live-action show Club 57.

In February 2016, Iginio Straffi mentioned that a live-action movie concept was being considered in partnership with Hollywood Gang Productions, but the project never proceeded. In March 2018, the idea was revisited as a television series after Netflix ordered a young-adult version for its streaming service. Straffi was involved in the early planning stages, and he declined a suggestion from Netflix for the male characters to be given larger roles.

After a pilot episode was scripted, Nickelodeon's American crew members from the cartoon, including Bloom's voice actress, Molly Quinn, travelled to meet the Fate production team and review the script. Francesco Artibani, one of the Italian writers of the animated version, was brought in to read the storyline. Rainbow's Joanne Lee oversaw the first season as an executive producer.

The writers behind Fate are entirely new to the Winx franchise, and they were recruited from teen dramas like The Vampire Diaries. Brian Young, who worked on seven seasons of The Vampire Diaries, is the creator and showrunner of Fate: The Winx Saga. According to an interview with The Guardian, Young chose to "ditch the look" of the cartoon Winx fairies, who have big eyes and sparkling outfits. He said, "Look, again, I'm a massive manga anime fan... but nobody looks like that." Some episodes of the first season were directed by Lisa James Larsson and Hannah Quinn.

Casting
Casting calls were held in August 2019. Abigail Cowen was announced to be headlining the series as Bloom in September 2019. "Bloom is a fire fairy who grew up in the first world, so she did not grow up in the other world. And she finds out, kind of by accident, that she has these powers," said Cowen.

Hannah van der Westhuysen, who plays Stella, revealed "Stella is a very complex girl. She appears a certain way, but she's actually a lot softer and she has a lot of barriers that need to be broken down." Precious Mustapha, who plays Aisha, said, "Aisha is a water fairy. From the offset, she seems quite confident with her powers. But, 'cause she's a perfectionist, she doesn't think that's good enough. She wants to always be developing."

Eliot Salt, who plays Terra, added, "Terra's power is all plant based. It's growing things and sending them off after people. She is the most welcoming. She loves it. She loves to meet new people. She gives too much."  

Elisha Applebaum, who portrays Musa, said, "Musa is an empath. Her power is to feel everyone's emotions, whether it's nature or anything around. She's just open and honest, but also she's not honest with herself and she's trying to learn how to do that."

Danny Griffin, Sadie Soverall, Freddie Thorp, Eve Best, and Robert James-Collier were cast to play Sky, Beatrix, Riven, Farah Dowling, and Saul Silva in the series.

Filming
Filming of the first season began in County Wicklow, Ireland, in September 2019 and concluded in December 2019. The primary filming locations included Killruddery House and Ardmore Studios in Bray. Some indoor scenes of the series were shot at Ashford Studios. Griffin, who plays Sky, said, "We had an incredible stunt crew who would take us through the steps very slowly and were really patient in the beginning. But it's always a big struggle, because later it had to be fast and accurate." Cowen, who plays Bloom, said, "Playing Bloom was interesting. I think I put a lot of pressure on myself because I knew that so many people are fans of the original Winx. It was a nerve-wracking but exciting and exhilarating experience."

Westhuysen, who portrays Stella, revealed, "I made diaries, scrapbooks, and things like that. They are really nice to look back on and will be very helpful for filming season two." Salt, who plays Terra, said, "I think what jumped out for me was just the range that everybody gets to do in the show, which is, I guess, quite unusual for most parts, but I think especially when you're generally playing young women, and the fact that we get to do comedy and tragedy and action and there's a lot to get your teeth into, so that's what really stood out to me." Mustapha, who plays Aisha, added, "I think the power of female friendship was something that really struck a chord with me, and I was like, 'This will be really fun to do' because we don't often get shows that are centred around women, let alone five women, so that was something I was definitely really excited about being a part of."

Music
Fate: The Winx Sagas music score was composed by Anne Nikitin, and the official playlist is available on Spotify, including 33 songs from various artists. Netflix also released a playlist for each fairyBloom's Fire Playlist, Stella's Light Playlist, Musa's Mind Playlist, Aisha's Water Playlist, Terra's Earth Playlist, and Beatrix's Air Playliston Spotify.

Season 2

Development
On 18 February 2021, Netflix renewed the series for a second season to consist of eight episodes. "The six episodes in season one only scratched the surface of this incredibly rich world and the powerful fairies who inhabit it. As Bloom’s story continues to evolve, I can't wait for you to learn even more about Aisha, Stella, Terra, and Musa! And you never know who might show up at Alfea next term…" said showrunner Brian Young. The second season, which ultimately consisted of seven episodes, released on 16 September 2022.

Young revealed the audience can expect Icy and Darcy, two of the Trix trio, if the show gets renewed for a season three.

Young added, "The benefit of a season 2 show is it gives you the ability to sort of expand the things that made season 1 great. We had more second-unit days, we had more VFX, more everything to be completely honest. We were able to really make the VFX sing to make the show feel like it's the best version of itself that it can be." Visual Effects supervisor David Houghton said, "In COVID times, it is difficult to rally as many extras as you would normally be able to. With some VFX help and some clever filming, we're able to fill out our world."

On Terra's coming out moment, Salt said, "I was told it was going to happen quite early on in Season 1. So I knew that whole time, and I kept it quiet-ish. It's so important, now more than ever, to see queer joy depicted on screen. In a setting where there's so much else going on, it was nice to put all of that aside for a moment to say that this is great." Young added, "Having Terra not be a canon character from the series gave us a little more leeway with her on the show. Audiences need to see people struggling, then coming out, then having a group of friends loving and supporting them. There's wish fulfillment in that."

Casting
On 20 July 2021, Paulina Chávez, Brandon Grace and Éanna Hardwicke were announced to be joining the series's second season as Flora, Grey and Sebastian. Chávez said about Flora, "She's very much a person that cares about people a lot, and that's what makes her so easily lovable. She really controls the room when she's in it, and that's something that I had to learn to do. I'm a little shy." She further recalled, "I remember when they actually announced it and there was a comment just like, 'Guys, she's Mexican. We won.'" Chávez said, "This is a big win for the Latino community. I'm in Ireland, what the hell?! Who would've thought this girl from El Paso would be here? It's pretty cool." Despite the whitewashing controversy, Applebaum returned as Musa.

On 27 July 2022, Miranda Richardson and Daniel Betts were announced to be replacing Lesley Sharp and Alex Macqueen as Rosalind Hale and Professor Ben Harvey, respectively. Sharp was not able to return to the series as she had other commitments scheduled and could not make the filming dates work.

Filming
The second season began filming in Ireland in July 2021, with filming concluding in November 2021. The Dublin Hellfire Club was one of the filming locations for the season. The scene featuring Cowen and Best in episode six was filmed with a body double. Farah's lines were played through a massive speaker as Best was not present on set at the moment. Weeks later, she filmed her own parts in London in front of a green screen because of COVID-related hurdles. Houghton added, "Their wings aren't just wings. Their kind of wings are made of various elemental forces, like water or light. They have to fly and then, at the end of it, they use their magical powers to blast the villain, who also has a magical effect all over his body. There were all those different elements in a scene that we had to shoot in 2 or 3 days on a set and then have green screen elements on top of that." He revealed, "Every visual effect shot costs around £310,000, depending on the complexity of it."

Cowen, who plays Bloom, said, "Everything is just kind of amped up. Through our costumes, our hair, our makeup, our characters feel more sure about themselves and are really coming into their own. New secrets are revealed, and it’s going to be really, really awesome. I've seen little clips, and it's very cinematic. We're really excited." Mustapha, who plays Aisha, added, "I feel like this season, in particular, everyone has their own story. We're not always together, and I think that's gonna be really exciting to watch because I've not seen some of the things others have done."

Westhuysen, who portrays Stella, revealed, "We'll sometimes have two different crews at the same time, so in one day you could film a scene from episodes 1, 2, 3, 4, and 5 just doting between two different crews. And that's a testament to how brilliant the crew is on this." Applebaum, who portrays Musa, said, "Some of the stunt-y scenes I've had to do have been a bit more challenging because they’re not things I've done before. It's definitely straining on the body. I've gone home and had an Epsom salt bath every single time I've done one, and then it's off to the next."

Talking about the fairy transformations in the final episode, Salt, who plays Terra, said, "It was so much fun. Going up in the little strings and having a man in a green suit spin me around with his hands was one of the most surreal things that has ever happened to me, and I enjoyed every second." Thorp, who plays Riven, said, "I spend a lot of time with our stunt team, who are fantastic and all very experienced, in martial arts, stunt driving, and sword fighting." About the fight scene in the ruins, he said, "It was amazing and epic to shoot because we did it in these old ruins, on top of this hill. It used to be where the Hellfire group used to meet, which is an old cult that had meetings in Ireland."

Music
"Dark Side" by Neoni was used in the trailer of the second season. Taylor Swift's "Wildest Dreams" was featured in a scene where Bloom and Sky are horse riding in a field.

Cancellation
On November 1, 2022, Brian Young announced that Netflix decided not to order another season, leaving the series on an unresolved cliffhanger.

Reception

Critical response
Review aggregator Rotten Tomatoes reported an approval rating of 40% based on 20 reviews, with an average rating of 5.2/10. The website's critical consensus reads, "Flat, flimsy, and forgettable, Fate: The Winx Saga is a fantastical flop that fails to capture the magic of its source material."

Caroline Framke of Variety criticized the series for relying too much on clichés and wrote that "while adapted from an animated show about friends that was largely targeted at pre-teens, it takes a page out of the Riverdale book by giving everything an ominous sheen of sexy intrigue". Joel Keller from Decider urged the audience to skip the series, stating that "while there's nothing inherently terrible about Fate: The Winx Saga, there's nothing about it that stands out. Also, do we need yet another dark and gritty remake of a beloved kids' series?" Deirdre Molumby from Entertainment.ie praised the cast but criticized the plot and the poor CGI quality. 

Petrana Radulovic of Polygon wrote that "Fate: The Winx Saga does create a compelling, nuanced plot. The worldbuilding is exciting, offering a spin on the animated series' world of fairies and non-magical, sword-wielding Specialists." Melissa Camacho of Common Sense Media criticized the diversity of the cast along with the teen angst shown in the series, but wrote that "Fate: The Winx Saga offers a story world that is easy to escape into, and easy to get caught up in, if you're looking for a fantastical universe to explore."

Viewership
The show peaked at #2 on Nielsen's Streaming Charts on the week of 25 January with 918 million minutes in viewership, trailing only Bridgerton at 936 million. On 20 April 2021, Netflix reported that 57 million of its subscribers watched the first season of the series during the first 28 days of its release.

Controversy
The series received backlash over the casting of Applebaum as Musa, who was coded as East Asian and whose character design was based on Lucy Liu, as well as the apparent replacement of Flora, who was coded as Latina and whose character design was based on Jennifer Lopez, with a new white character named Terra.

In response to the backlash, Abigail Cowen said she was not involved in the casting but hoped that Flora would be introduced in the second season, saying "I do think diversity both in front of and behind the camera is vital and much-needed throughout the industry and internationally. So I think it's important that we are having these conversations." Brian Young has said Terra is the cousin of Flora, leaving Flora's inclusion in the show a possibility. Elisha Applebaum, who plays Musa, also addressed the controversy. "It's really sad to see that fans were upset with the casting. I wasn't involved in the casting but I hope that what they've seen and how I've portrayed Musa was to their liking," Elisha told Digital Spy.

Responding to the backlash to the casting whitewashing, Iginio Straffi said that Rainbow S.p.A. demanded that the ethnic diversity of Winx Club be respected in the live-action adaptation, but that Netflix chose to make different casting choices.

Tie-in media

Novels
On 2 February 2021, a novelization of the first season, titled The Fairies' Path, was released. It features bonus scenes and character backstories not seen on the show. It was written by Irish author Sarah Rees Brennan under the pen name Ava Corrigan.

On 16 August 2022, another novel, titled Lighting the Fire, was released. It features an original story not seen in the show, set before the events of the first season. It was again written by Sarah Rees Brennan, this time under her real name.

Comic books
In February 2023, it was announced that Rainbow had partnered with American independent comic book publisher Mad Cave Studios to publish middle-grade and young adult graphic novels based on Winx Club and Fate: The Winx Saga, the first of which will be released in 2024.

Notes

References

External links
 
 

2020s British LGBT-related drama television series
2020s British teen television series
2020s Italian television series
2020s supernatural television series
2020s teen drama television series
2021 British television series debuts
2021 Italian television series debuts
2022 British television series endings
2022 Italian television series endings
British fantasy television series
British supernatural television shows
British teen drama television series
Dark fantasy television series
Demons in television
English-language Netflix original programming
Italian drama television series
Italian fantasy television series
Television about fairies and sprites
Television about magic
Television series about parallel universes
Television series about teenagers
Television series by Rainbow S.r.l.
Television series set in fictional countries
Television shows filmed in the Republic of Ireland
Winx Club
Works based on animated television series